Cilieni is a commune in Olt County, Oltenia, Romania. It is composed of a single village, Cilieni.

References

Communes in Olt County
Localities in Oltenia